Green Mountain is an unincorporated community and township in Yancey County, North Carolina, United States. Green Mountain sits along the Toe River, approximately seven miles north of Burnsville, the county seat. It shares a name with the ridgeline north of Burnsville that includes Phillips Knob and Rocky Knob. Its elevation is 2,159 feet (658 m). It has a post office with the ZIP code 28740, which is one of only two ZIP codes used for street addresses in the county.

References

Unincorporated communities in Yancey County, North Carolina
Unincorporated communities in North Carolina